Bruce Le (born June 5, 1950, Burma), birth name Huang Jianlong, a.k.a. Wong Kin-lung, is a Macao-established Burmese (or Taiwanese; there are conflicting reports) born (British descent/Macao descent and half-Chinese/half-Burmese) martial artist and actor  known for his martial arts film of the 1970s and 1980s. Most of these were inexpensively produced and were made to capitalize on the martial arts phenomenon started by Bruce Lee, whose death in 1973 left a large box office void (hence the name change to "Bruce Le").

Bruce Le was a contract player for the Shaw Brothers, where he appeared in the science fiction opus Infra-Man. He is better known, however, for his Bruce Lee–inspired "tribute" films, also known as "Bruceploitation".

Filmography as an actor
 Infra-Man (1975)
 Bruce's Deadly Fingers (1976)
 The Big Boss Part II (1976)
 Return of Bruce (1977)
 Bruce and Shaolin Kung Fu (1977)
 Bruce and the Shaolin Bronzemen (1977)
 Super Gang (1978)
 My Name Called Bruce (1978)
 Way of the Dragon 2 (1978) (a.k.a. Bruce Le's Greatest Revenge)
 Bruce and Shaolin Kung Fu 2 (1978)
 Enter the Game of Death (1978)
 Return of Red Tiger (1978)
 Re-Enter the Dragon (1979)
 Bruce the Super Hero (1979)
 Treasure of Bruce Le (1980)
 Bruce's Fist of Vengeance (1980)
 Bruce, King of Kung Fu (1980)
 Challenge of the Tiger (1980)
 The Clones of Bruce Lee (1980)
 Katilon Ke Kaatil (1981)
 Enter Another Dragon (1981)
 Cold Blooded Murder (1981)
 Bruce vs. Bill (1981)
 Bruce and the Dragon Fist (1981)
 Ninja Strikes Back (1982)
 Bruce Le vs. Ninja (1982)
 Cameroon Connection (1984)
 Future Hunters (1985)
 Return of the Kickfighter (1987)
 Ninja Over the Great Wall (1987)
 Bruce's Secret Kung Fu (1988)
 Sex and Zen (1991)
 Black Spot (1991)
 Comfort Women (1992)
 The Eyes of Dawn (2014)

Bruce Le has been credited by some video companies as appearing in the films Cobra, Return of Fist of Fury, and Bruce is Loose, but this is untrue.

Filmography as director includes
 Bruce the Super Hero (1979)
 Bruce, King of Kung Fu (1980)
 Challenge of the Tiger (1980)
 Ninja Over the Great Wall (1987)
 Black Spot (1991)
 Comfort Women (1992)
 The Eyes of Dawn (2014)

References

External links
 Bruce Le Movies on GooHead
 
 Clones of Bruce Lee – The Ultimate Guide To Bruce Lee Exploitation Cinema

Hong Kong male actors

Living people
Hong Kong stunt performers
Macau martial artists
Taiwanese martial artists
Macau male martial artists
Taiwanese male martial artists
Hong Kong film directors
Taiwanese film directors
Bruce Lee imitators
Burmese people of Chinese descent
Burmese emigrants to Hong Kong
Expatriates in Macau
Immigrants to Macau
Macau emigrants to Hong Kong
Macau people of Burmese descent
British people of Burmese descent
Taiwanese emigrants to Hong Kong
Taiwanese people of Burmese descent
1950 births